Jean-Pierre Smith (born 24 January 1990) is a South African professional rugby union player who plays as a prop for the LA Giltinis of Major League Rugby (MLR) in the United States.

Smith previously played prop for the Queensland Reds. Smith is the twin brother of Ruan Smith who is also a professional rugby player.

Career

Smith emigrated to Australia along with twin-brother Ruan at the end of 2010 and were initially based in Brisbane, Australia. Although not named in either the regular or extended playing squads for the 2013 Super Rugby season, Smith was a member of the Brumbies group that traveled to South Africa and New Zealand for the Super Rugby semi-final and final. He didn't get any game time in 2013, but was named in their extended playing squad for 2014.

Smith made his Super Rugby debut on 7 March 2014 as a second-half replacement for Scott Sio as the Brumbies defeated the  29-21 in Wellington. Also in 2014, he played at the National Rugby Championship for Canberra Vikings.

Return to Western Province

In July 2015, it was announced that Smith would return to former side  for the 2015 Currie Cup Premier Division campaign.

References

1990 births
South African rugby union players
Rugby union props
Living people
White South African people
Western Province (rugby union) players
ACT Brumbies players
Canberra Vikings players
Expatriate rugby union players in Australia
South African expatriates in Australia
South African twins
Twin sportspeople
People from Vryburg
Alumni of Paarl Gimnasium
Stormers players
Queensland Reds players
Griffons (rugby union) players
Brisbane City (rugby union) players
LA Giltinis players
Lions (United Rugby Championship) players
Golden Lions players
Rugby union players from North West (South African province)